Norrbomia is a genus of flies belonging to the family lesser dung flies.

Species
N. beckeri (Duda, 1938)
N. costalis (Zetterstedt, 1847)
N. cryptica (Papp, 1973)
N. demeteri Papp, 1988
N. elephantis Papp, 1988
N. frigipennis (Spuler, 1925)
N. fulvipennis Marshall & Norrbom, 1992
N. fumipennis (Stenhammar, 1855)
N. fuscana (Becker, 1909)
N. gravis (Adams, 1905)
N. hispanica (Duda, 1923)
N. hypopygialis (Richards, 1939)
N. indica Papp, 1988
N. keniaca Papp, 1988
N. lacteipennis (Malloch, 1913)
N. marginatis (Adams, 1905)
N. mexicana Marshall & Norrbom, 1992
N. micropyga (Papp, 1973)
N. mpazaensis (Vanschuytbroeck, 1959)
N. nepalensis Papp, 2003
N. nilotica (Becker, 1903)
N. nitidifrons (Duda, 1923)
N. niveipennis (Duda, 1923)
N. sarcophaga Papp, 1988
N. scripta (Malloch, 1915)
N. singusta Marshall & Norrbom, 1992
N. somogyii (Papp, 1973)
N. sordida (Zetterstedt, 1847)
N. stuckenbergi (Hackman, 1967)
N. szelenyii (Papp, 1974)
N. triglabra Marshall & Norrbom, 1992
N. tropica (Duda, 1923)
N. unicolor (Becker, 1908)
N. utukuruensis (Vanschuytbroeck, 1959)
N. yukonensis Marshall & Norrbom, 1992

References

Sphaeroceridae
Diptera of Africa
Diptera of North America
Diptera of Asia
Diptera of Australasia
Muscomorph flies of Europe
Sphaeroceroidea genera